Assunta Hospital (Chinese: 亞松大医院) is a first private hospital in Petaling Jaya, Petaling District, Selangor, Malaysia. Assunta Hospital was founded by a group of missionaries from the Franciscan Missionaries of Mary (FMM) in 1954. It is a 245-bed hospital complex. Assunta Hospital is one of the oldest hospital in Malaysia.

Assunta Integrated Social Services (ASSISS) 
Assunta has its own charity wing called Assunta Integrated Social Services (ASSISS). The private hospital, through ASSISS charity programme, donates 50 per cent of its profits to the hardcore poor.

Awards and Achievements

References

Hospital buildings completed in 1954
Hospitals in Selangor
Petaling Jaya
Voluntary hospitals
20th-century architecture in Malaysia